Franz Josef Plankl (born October 12, 1989) is an Italian ice hockey coach and former left wing. He is currently assistant coach of HC Merano in the Serie B.

External links
 Player Profile Eliteprospects.com

Living people
1989 births
Ice hockey people from Bolzano
Italian ice hockey left wingers